Logan Heights is an urban neighborhood in central San Diego, California.  It is bordered by Interstate 5 on the south and west, Interstate 15 on the east, and Imperial Avenue on the north. It is part of the Southeastern Planning Area.

History
In 1871, Congressman John A. Logan wrote legislation to provide federal land grants and subsidies for a transcontinental railroad ending in San Diego.  A street laid in 1881 was named Logan Heights after him, and the name came to be applied to the general area.  Plans for a railroad never successfully materialized, and the area was predominantly residential by the start of the 20th century, becoming one of San Diego's oldest communities.  Its transformation began in 1910 with the influx of  refugees of the Mexican Revolution, who soon became the majority ethnic group.  For this reason, the southern part of the original Logan Heights neighborhood came to be called Barrio Logan.

Demographics
Logan Heights is home to one of the highest concentrations of Latinos in the City. Current demographics for the neighborhood are as follows: people of Hispanic/Latino heritage make up 87.6%, followed by African-Americans at 7.1%, then non-Hispanic Whites at 3.7%, Asian at 1.4%, and others at 0.1%

Governance
It is part of City Council District 8 and is represented by Councilwoman Vivian Moreno. The city is currently (2010) updating the community plan.

Culture
Barrio Logan is known  as the home of Chicano Park. A new Logan Heights branch of the San Diego Public Library opened in 2007.

See also 
 Chicano Park
Logan Heights Gang

References

4. sandiegohistory.org/journal, click on Norman Baynard's Logan Heights 1939 - 1985, plus other journals on blacks in Logan Heights and San Diego

External links

Neighborhoods in San Diego
Urban communities in San Diego
Chicano and Mexican neighborhoods in California
Mexican-American culture in San Diego